I'll Give You Something to Remember Me By is an album led by pianist John Hicks, recorded in 1987.

Recording and music
The album was recorded in Monster, The Netherlands, on March 12, 1987. The musicians were pianist John Hicks, bassist Curtis Lundy, and drummer Idris Muhammad.

Release
I'll Give You Something to Remember Me By was released by Limetree Records. A re-release by the same company added one track – "Ted's Delight" – from the same session.

Reception
Critic Stuart Nicholson commented that the recording "returns to Hicks' refreshingly contemporary swing".

Track listing
"Hold It Down"
"Pas De Trois"
"Monk's Mood"
"I Didn't Know What Time It Was"
"Airegin"
"My Foolish Heart"
"Blue In Green"
"Coral Keys"

Personnel
John Hicks – piano
Curtis Lundy – bass
Idris Muhammad – drums

References

John Hicks (jazz pianist) albums
1987 albums